Superman '78 is a superhero comic book limited series published by DC Comics that serves as a continuation of Richard Donner's Superman films. Robert Venditti, who serves as the writer, revealed that he was working on a follow up miniseries.

Plot
As Clark Kent discusses his future as a reporter at the Daily Planet with his boss, Perry White, Metropolis is suddenly attacked by a robot from outer space, which begins wreaking havoc on the streets while scanning the people and environment. Clark suits up as Superman and manages to destroy the robot, but not before it identifies him as a Kryptonian and informs its creator, Brainiac, an exterrastrial cyborg from the planet Colu who is the last of his kind and obsessed with preserving life and cultures. Superman takes the head of the robot and gives it to Lex Luthor (who was recently released on parole) to analyze. 

While discussing the robot with Lois Lane, Clark notices a large spaceship approaching the city. Brainiac arrives and demands Metropolis to hand Superman over to him, believing his presence is endangering Earth's ecosystem. Superman fends off the robots, but ultimately surrenders when Brainiac threatens to destroy the city. After taking him into his ship, Brainiac shrinks Clark and places him in the bottle city of Kandor, the last remains of Krypton that was preserved before the planet's destruction, where he discovers that a portion of Kryptonians survived, including his birth parents, Jor-El and Lara. Clark agrees to succeed his father as leader of Krypton's council affairs, but has a hard time adapting to the new environment.

On Earth, Lex brings Lois into his secret hideout and reveals he planted a receiver on Superman before Brainiac took him. He allows Lois to use his space transmitter to communicate with Superman, which Brainiac is quickly alerted to. Lex reveals his plan was for Brainiac to intercept the transmission so he could challenge the alien's intellect. However, it instead encourages Brainiac to excise Metropolis and shrink it to preserve it like he's done for the other civilizations, leading Lex to flee in a hot air balloon. 

Jor-El finds the receiver on Superman's suit and realizes he can modify it to help Clark return to normal size and escape from the bottle. Despite Lara's protests, Clark agrees to the procedure so he can save Metropolis and Kandor. After returning to the ship and regaining his powers, Superman faces off against Brainiac and his legion of robots. He defeats the cyborg and retrieves all of the bottled civilizations before the core of the ship explodes, destroying Brainiac and his backup models. Metropolis begins plummeting back to the ground, but Superman helps the city land safely.

Clark begins working on follow-up stories of the incident with Lois at the Daily Planet. He briefly stops by the Fortress of Solitude to talk with his parents, vowing to find a way to free them and the rest of the civilizations Brainiac had in his possession.

Publications
 Superman '78 #1 (2021-08-24): Debut of Brainiac
 Superman '78 #2 (2021-09-28)
 Superman '78 #3 (2021-11-02)
 Superman '78 #4 (2021-11-23)
 Superman '78 #5 (2021-12-28)
 Superman '78 #6 (2022-01-25)

Collected editions
 Hardcover, DC Comics, 2022.

Reception 
Superman '78 was well received by critics scoring an average rating of 8.8 for the entire series based on 52 critic reviews aggregated by ComicBookRoundup.com.

See also
 Batman '89

References

External links
DC Comics page
DC Fandom page

2021 comics debuts
Superman titles
Comics based on films
DC Comics titles
Superman (1978 film series)
Sequel comics